Read Island Provincial Park is a provincial park in British Columbia, Canada. It is located on the south end of Read Island.  Established in 1996, the park contains approximately 637 ha.

References

External links

Read Island Provincial Park, BC Parks

Provincial Parks of the Discovery Islands
Provincial parks of British Columbia
1996 establishments in British Columbia
Protected areas established in 1996